Tulare is a city in Tulare County, California. The population was 68,875 at the 2020 census.  It is located in the heart of the San Joaquin Valley, eight miles south of Visalia and sixty miles north of Bakersfield.  The city is named for the Tulare Lake, once the largest freshwater lake west of the Great Lakes.

Etymology

The English name Tulare derives ultimately from Classical Nahuatl tōllin, "sedge" or "reeds", by way of Spanish tule, which also exists in English as a loanword. The name is cognate with Tula, Tultepec, and Tultitlán de Mariano Escobedo.

History

The Yokuts people built reed boats and fished in what was later to be called Tulare Lake in their homeland for centuries, until the invasion and settlement by the Spanish and American pioneers. When California became a state in 1850, Tulare did not yet exist as a town. Tulare was founded in 1872, by the Southern Pacific Railroad. The town was named for Lake Tulare. The lake had been named for the tule rush plant (Schoenoplectus acutus) (pictured left), a species of bulrush that predominantly lined the marshes and sloughs of its shore.

Transportation was the first impetus behind the establishment of the town. Tulare flourished as the headquarters of the railroad in the area. The town suffered through many difficult challenges, but despite burning down and being rebuilt three times in its first fourteen years of existence, it was eventually incorporated in 1888.

In 1891, the railroad moved its headquarters to Bakersfield, decimating the community. Although the railroad was gone, the community of Tulare struggled to become an agricultural center for California, which it is today. Due to the inadequate  of rainfall per year, water resources had to be found. In order to bring water to Tulare, citizens established the Tulare Irrigation District and issued $500,000 in bonds to build an extensive canal system carrying water from the Sierra Nevada. In 1903, when the bonds were paid off early, they celebrated by having a bond-burning celebration. Once the water system was established, Tulare burgeoned, becoming a center for farming and agriculture because of its central location.

Until its close, Tagus Ranch produce was known the world over, and was served in the finest restaurants throughout America. At the end of World War II, a portion of Tagus Ranch served as a German POW camp.

The cotton strike of the California agricultural strikes of 1933 was planned in Tulare by a group of seventy-eight men and women. As recorded by Chicano historian Rodolfo Acuña, "they concluded that it took the average picker 10 hours to harvest 300 pounds. Planters offered 40 cents a hundredweight – that was not enough to buy enough food and gas to get to the next job."

In 1940, famed aerobatic stunt pilot J.G. "Tex" Rankin secured a U.S. War Department contract to open and operate a civilian flying school to train United States Army Air Corps flight cadets. Rankin opened the Rankin Aeronautical Academy in Tulare in February 1941, where it operated throughout the duration of World War II. During its heyday Rankin Field, as it was otherwise known, trained 10,000 pilots in primary flight training, including twelve future Army Air Corps Aces and two Medal of Honor recipients.
 
During World War II, in response to West Coast wartime hysteria, the U.S. Army temporarily assumed control of the Tulare County Fairgrounds, converting it to the Tulare Assembly Center, a temporary detention center for Japanese Americans. The Assembly Center was administered by the Wartime Civil Control Administration, under the Western Defense Command and the U.S. 4th Army. The first internee was inducted on April 27, 1942, and the last internee departed on September 4, 1942. The top population numbered 4,978 residents, many of whom were citizens born in the United States. In the latter part of 1942, internees began being moved to the ten more permanent "War Relocation Camps". The majority of internees from the Tulare Assembly Center were sent to the Gila River War Relocation Center in Arizona. These temporary sites were largely located on fairgrounds or race tracks in completely public and visible locations.

Tulare was the site of the National Championships for the Decathlon in Track and Field in 1949, 1950, 1952, and 1962, as well as the Olympic Trials for the Decathlon in 1952.

Geography
Tulare is located at  (36.206601, −119.342404).
Located directly between Fresno and Bakersfield, Tulare is in the heart of the Central Valley. Although the foothills of the Sierra Nevada are only about 20 miles east of town, they are seldom visible due to the chronically poor air quality and very high levels of airborne particulate matter, soot, and other pollution.

Climate
The climate of this agricultural community is varied, with cool and damp winters with a mean temperature of 45 degrees, but very hot dry summers, with a mean temperatures of 95 to 110 degrees. The mean average rainfall was 10 inches prior to the drought that began in 2012 and remains ongoing as of September 2018. 
Tulare consistently suffers from year round air pollution and air quality that is among the worst in the United States because of both geographic conditions (hemmed in valley, weak winds) and the prevalence of diesel fuel exhaust from farming and truck traffic on Highway 99. Farming also exacerbates this because it kicks up tremendous amounts of dust, especially in the late summer and autumn months.

Demographics

2010
At the 2010 census Tulare had a population of 59,278. The racial makeup of Tulare was 36,347 (61.3%) White, 2,328 (3.9%) African American, 694 (1.2%) Native American, 1,276 (2.2%) Asian, 80 (0.1%) Pacific Islander, 15,713 (26.5%) from other races, and 2,840 (4.8%) from two or more races. Hispanic or Latino people of any race were 34,062 persons (57.5%).

The census reported that 59,000 people (99.5% of the population) lived in households, 62 (0.1%) lived in non-institutionalized group quarters, and 216 (0.4%) were institutionalized.

There were 17,720 households, 8,991 (50.7%) had children under the age of 18 living in them, 9,373 (52.9%) were opposite-sex married couples living together, 3,190 (18.0%) had a female householder with no husband present, 1,507 (8.5%) had a male householder with no wife present. There were 1,543 (8.7%) unmarried opposite-sex partnerships, and 120 (0.7%) same-sex married couples or partnerships. 2,862 households (16.2%) were one person and 1,249 (7.0%) had someone living alone who was 65 or older. The average household size was 3.33. There were 14,070 families (79.4% of households); the average family size was 3.68.

The age distribution was 19,757 people (33.3%) under the age of 18, 6,229 people (10.5%) aged 18 to 24, 16,247 people (27.4%) aged 25 to 44, 11,707 people (19.7%) aged 45 to 64, and 5,338 people (9.0%) who were 65 or older. The median age was 29.1 years. For every 100 females, there were 96.6 males. For every 100 females age 18 and over, there were 93.9 males.

There were 18,863 housing units at an average density of 897.5 per square mile, of the occupied units 10,389 (58.6%) were owner-occupied and 7,331 (41.4%) were rented. The homeowner vacancy rate was 2.8%; the rental vacancy rate was 5.5%. 33,367 people (56.3% of the population) lived in owner-occupied housing units and 25,633 people (43.2%) lived in rental housing units.

2000
As of the census of 2000, there were 43,994 people in 13,543 households, including 10,753 families, in the city. The racial makeup of the city was 56.38% White, 5.02% African American, 1.40% Native American, 2.02% Asian, 0.12% Pacific Islander, 29.09% from other races, and 5.96% from two or more races. Hispanic or Latino people of any race were 65.59% of the population.

Of the 13,543 households 46.3% had children under the age of 18 living with them, 55.9% were married couples living together, 17.1% had a female householder with no husband present, and 20.6% were non-families. 16.7% of households were one person and 8.0% were one person aged 65 or older.  The average household size was 3.22 and the average family size was 3.57.

The age distribution was 34.6% under the age of 18, 10.5% from 18 to 24, 28.7% from 25 to 44, 16.8% from 45 to 64, and 9.4% 65 or older.  The median age was 28 years. For every 100 females, there were 94.4 males.  For every 100 females age 18 and over, there were 91.0 males.

The median household income was $33,637 and the median family income  was $36,935. Males had a median income of $31,467 versus $23,775 for females. The per capita income for the city was $13,655.  About 16.9% of families and 20.7% of the population were below the poverty line, including 27.1% of those under age 18 and 14.0% of those age 65 or over.

Culture
There is a large population of Portuguese residents in Tulare, many of whom immigrated from the Azores Islands to start farms and dairies in the Central Valley, becoming part of the now famous Central Valley agricultural boom of the 20th century.

Economy

Largest employers
According to the city's 2020 Comprehensive Annual Financial Report, the top employers in the city are:

The backbone of Tulare's economy continues to be its agricultural and dairy industry. Tulare is responsible for a significant part of Tulare County's 342,600 dairy cows, which produce more than 8.9 billion pounds of milk each year. The nation's largest single-site dairy complex, operated by Land O'Lakes, is located in Tulare.

Tulare is the home of the Tulare County Fair, held since 1915. Tulare is also home to the internationally known World Ag Expo, held annually at the International Agri-Center. Since 1968, the three-day event in February is the largest annual agricultural exposition in the world. Over 100,000 people from throughout the world visit the Expo annually.

Government

Local government 
The Mayor and Vice-Mayor are selected by the council for two-year terms.
 Mayor: Dennis A. Mederos
 Vice-mayor: Terry A. Sayre

List of mayors 
This is a list of Tulare mayors by year.

State and federal 

Education

Elementary and middle schools
The Tulare City School District operates 10 elementary schools, five middle schools, and two k-8 schools in Tulare. The ten elementary schools are Cypress, Heritage, Garden, Kohn, Lincoln, Maple, Mission Valley, Pleasant, Roosevelt, and Wilson. Lincoln, Maple, and Kohn Elementary also have Title I preschools. The five middle schools are Cherry Avenue, Live Oak, Los Tules, Mulcahy, and Community Day School. The K-8 school is Alpine Vista, opened in the 2013–14 school year. There is also a private K-8 school called St. Aloysius. There are also five K-8 country schools: Buena Vista, Oak Valley, Palo Verde, Waukena and Sundale.

High schools
Secondary education in Tulare is provided by the Tulare Joint Union High School District. The district operates five high schools in the city: Tulare Union, Tulare Western, Mission Oak, Tech Prep, and Sierra Vista.

Higher education
Tulare students have two local area community colleges from which to choose: College of the Sequoias in Tulare, and College of the Sequoias in nearby Visalia. College of the Sequoias new Tulare Center for Agriculture and Technology campus, located on East Bardsley Ave in Tulare, opened in 2013. The Tulare Center is forecast to be a full 10,000 student college by 2040.

Transportation
Tulare is located on California's central corridor, State Route 99. State Routes 63 and 137 also serve the city.

Air
The City of Tulare owns and operates their own municipal airport, Mefford Field, which has an asphalt runway of 3,914 feet. 60 private planes are currently based there.

National/international commercial air service is available from: Fresno (1 hr), Bakersfield (1 hr. 15 min.), as well as limited commercial service available from Visalia (15 min) and Porterville (40 min).

Rail
Tulare is located on the main line of the Union Pacific Railroad.

Bus
Tulare's Greyhound bus depot offers frequent packages and personnel service to all points in the west. The local Tulare InterModal Express offers a "fixed route" schedule in the city, as well as a Dial-A-Ride service. Tulare County Area Transit connects Tulare and Delano.

Honors
In December 2010 the City of Tulare was recognized with an honorable mention by the California Sustainability Alliance's Sustainability Showcase Awards. The honor commends the city for its commitment to sustainability through extensive building retrofits, residential solar programs and forthcoming citywide Climate Action Plan.

In April 2011 the City of Tulare received the Climate Change Award for the city's Energy Efficient Strategy at the 2011 Green California Summit and Exposition.

In September 2011, the city of Tulare's Redevelopment Agency received a total of two awards for a single redevelopment project.  The Tule Vista Housing Development received the first place American Planning Association 2011 Central Section Outstanding Planning Project award, as well as the 2011 Award of Excellence from the California State Chapter of the American Planning Association.  The two awards also went to Pacific West Communities and Tulare County Housing Authority, who worked in conjunction with the Tulare Redevelopment Agency on the project.

Twin towns – sister cities
Tulare's sister cities are:
Angra do Heroísmo, Azores
Inverell, Australia

Notable people
Jack Aker – Major League Baseball player, born in Tulare
Bryan Allen – pedal-powered aircraft pilot
Albert Greenwood Brown - on death row for rape and murder
Bonnie Bryant – LPGA golfer; born in Tulare
The Charades – popular R&B/doo-wop musical group of the 1960s
Max Choboian – professional football player for Denver Broncos
Matt Crafton – NASCAR driver
Zac Diles – professional football player for Kansas City Chiefs
Dominique Dorsey – professional football player, the running back for Saskatchewan Roughriders of Canadian Football League
Jim Ellis – professional baseball player; born in Tulare.
Fred Ford – professional football player for Buffalo Bills and Los Angeles Chargers
Hal Fowler - American poker player, world championship winner in 1979, at the 1979 World Series of Poker; long-time resident of Tulare
Jeremiah Green – professional football player, for Jacksonville Jaguars
Virgil Green – professional football player, member of Super Bowl 50 champion Denver Broncos; born in Tulare
Bryce Harris – professional football player for New Orleans Saints
Sim Iness – Olympic discus gold medalist in 1952 Summer Olympics
Odell Jones – professional baseball player for five MLB teams; born in Tulare
Bob Mathias – two-time Olympic decathlon gold medalist and U.S. Congressman; born in Tulare
Mike Morgan – professional baseball player, member of 2001 World Series champion Arizona Diamondbacks; born in Tulare
Rance Mulliniks – professional baseball player and broadcaster; born in Tulare
Lois Neilson – silent movie actress: first wife of actor and comedian Stan Laurel; born in Tulare
Devin Nunes – U.S. Congressmen from CA; born in Tulare
 General Maurice A. Preston – Air Force four-star general, Commander of USAFE 1966–1968
Tex Rankin – international aerobatic champion, air racer, barnstormer, and stunt pilot
Shirley Shahan – pioneering drag racer; first female driver to win an NHRA title
James Stallworth – world high school record holder for the long jump
Bob Veith – auto racer; born in Tulare
Marquess Wilson – professional football player, wide receiver for New York Jets; born in Tulare
Admiral Elmo R. Zumwalt, Jr. – Chief of Naval Operations 1970–1974

References

External links

Tulare Historical Museum website

1888 establishments in California
Cities in Tulare County, California
Incorporated cities and towns in California
Populated places established in 1888
Tulare, California